Blue Rainbow was a Canadian Children's television series created and hosted by Lutia Lausane (Lil) who was always dressed in a pink dress and told stories while playing her harp.  Michael Kennard and John Turner played the clowns Dirk and Drock for three seasons.

References

External links
 

1980s Canadian children's television series
1990s Canadian children's television series
2000s Canadian children's television series
1984 Canadian television series debuts
2000 Canadian television series endings
CBC Kids original programming
Global Television Network original programming
Canadian television shows featuring puppetry